Ibrahim Idris  (born 1949) is a Nigeria businessman who was elected governor of Kogi State in Nigeria in April 2003, and reelected in April 2007. He is a member of the People's Democratic Party (PDP).
Idris was succeeded by his brother-in-law Captain Idris Wada, who won election in December 2011 and took office in January 2012.

Background
Ibrahim Idris was born in 1949 at Idah town, Idah Local Government Area of Kogi State. He started his primary education in 1954 in Onitsha, Anambra State. In 1962, he moved to Kano, where he completed his primary education in 1963. He moved to Buguma in Rivers State where he enrolled in King's Commercial College in 1964. He holds a bachelor's degree from University of Abuja

After leaving school he launched the Ibro Trading Company, with interests in construction, furniture making, hotels and other activities. In 1970, he moved to Sokoto where he set up the Ibrahim Furniture Factory, the largest in Sokoto State, and later the Ibro Hotel, the first 3-star hotel in the old Sokoto State.

Governor of Kogi State

Idris, an Igala, emerged PDP governorship candidate for Kogi State in the 2003 Kogi State gubernatorial election after defeating an Ebira leader, Senator Ahmed Tijani Ahmed at the primaries of then ruling party in Nigeria at the federal level.
He was elected governor of Kogi State on the PDP platform in April 2003, after beating then governor Prince Abubakar Audu of the All People's Party, APP. Ibrahim assumed office on 29 May 2003.
 
Idris was re-elected in April 2007, but was later nullified on the grounds that the Independent National Electoral Commission (INEC) had wrongly excluded the All Nigeria Peoples Party (ANPP) candidate Abubakar Audu from 14 April 2007 governorship poll. On 6 February 2008, the Court of Appeal upheld this ruling and ordered a new election to be held within three months. President Umaru Yar'Adua ordered the Speaker of the House of Assembly to take over as acting governor.

In a repeat election held on March 29, 2008, Idris was returned as the Governor of Kogi State. His opponent, Abubakar Audu, challenged the result of the by-election on the basis of massive electoral fraud including violence and theft of ballot boxes.

ADC Airlines Flight 53 'miracle'
On the October 29, 2006 plane crash, his 3 daughters survived the accident along with six other people. About this he claimed: 'This is a superlative show of mercy to me and my family by Almighty Allah. I lack words to express my gratitude to the Almighty Creator for this favour. I can only call on Nigerians and indeed humanity in general to join me in thanksgiving for His benevolence'.

Personal 
Idris was a spouse to Zainab Ibrahim Idris who died on 31 May 2014 from cancer related ailment.

See also
List of Governors of Kogi State

References

1949 births
Living people
Nigerian Muslims
Governors of Kogi State
Peoples Democratic Party state governors of Nigeria